Talking Straight (1988 Bantam Books) is a book written by Lee Iacocca, then CEO of Chrysler Motors, with Sonny Kleinfeld. It was written partly in response to Akio Morita's Made in Japan, a non-fiction book praising Japan's post-war hard-working culture. Talking Straight praised the innovation and creativity of Americans.

References

1988 non-fiction books
Business books
Books by Lee Iacocca
Bantam Books books